Vladimir Dzhgunatovich Kvarchelia (1919 – April 22, 1985) was Minister of Culture of the Abkhaz ASSR from October 1954 until March 1967. Kvarchelia was born in 1919 in the village of Achandara in Gudauta District and died on 22 April 1985.

References

1919 births
1985 deaths
People from Gudauta District
Communist Party of the Soviet Union members
Ministers for Culture of Abkhazia

Recipients of the Medal "For Courage" (Russia)
Recipients of the Order of the Red Banner of Labour
Recipients of the Order of the Red Star